Wilbär is a polar bear who was born in captivity at the Wilhelma Zoo in Stuttgart, Germany on  December 10, 2007. Wilbär made his first public appearance on April 16, 2008, swimming alongside his mother. His name comes from combining the name of the zoo with the German word for bear (Bär). Zoo officials have registered the name as a trademark.

Sweden
In May 2009, Wilbär left Wilhelma Zoo and was shipped to Orsa Grönklitt wildlife park in Sweden. There he is paired with Ewa, from the Rotterdam Zoo, and received many gifts from Germany on his birthday. In spring of 2011, zoo officials thought Ewa might be pregnant. Wilbär's first female cub, Miki, was born in December of 2013. Two twin cubs, Noori and Nanook, were born in November of 2021.

Netherlands 
On March 12, 2022, Wilbär was transferred to the Dierenrijk Zoo in Nuenen, Netherlands.

See also
 Knut (polar bear)
 Flocke
 List of individual bears

References

External links
 Wilbär Tagebuch on the Wilhelma website 

Individual polar bears
2007 animal births
Male mammals
Individual animals in Germany